Old Post Office is a historic home and post office building located at Kirkwood, New Castle County, Delaware.  It was built about 1870, and is a two-story, five bay, frame double house with a mansard roof in the Second Empire style. The roof has decorative slate and the front facade features a full-width porch supported by five chamfered, wooden posts. Part of the house was once occupied by a post office and store.

It was added to the National Register of Historic Places in 1982.

References

Houses on the National Register of Historic Places in Delaware
Post office buildings on the National Register of Historic Places in Delaware
Second Empire architecture in Delaware
Government buildings completed in 1870
Buildings and structures in New Castle County, Delaware
Houses completed in 1870
Houses in New Castle County, Delaware
National Register of Historic Places in New Castle County, Delaware